Gaston Junior/Senior High School is a public high school in Gaston, Oregon, United States.

Academics
In 2008, 78% of the high school's seniors received their high school diploma. Of 45 students, 35 graduated, five dropped out, and five were still in high school the following year.

References

High schools in Washington County, Oregon
Public middle schools in Oregon
Public high schools in Oregon